Rendez-Vous is an album by trumpeter/vocalist Chet Baker which was recorded in 1979 and released on the French Bingow label.

Track listing 
 "Blues for Inge" (Jean Paul Florens) – 4:30
 "What's New?" (Bob Haggart, Johnny Burke) – 5:01
 "Old Date" (Henry Florens) – 6:16
 "Darn That Dream" (Jimmy Van Heusen, Eddie DeLange) – 3:42
 "My Funny Valentine" [Take II] (Richard Rodgers, Lorenz Hart) – 5:22
 "Secret Love" (Sammy Fain, Paul Francis Webster) – 5:41
 "Round Midnight" [Take II] (Thelonious Monk) – 5:48

Personnel 
Chet Baker – trumpet, vocals
Henry Florens – piano
Jean Paul Florens – guitar 
Jim Richardson – bass
Tony Mann – drums

References 

Chet Baker albums
1980 albums